A Balloon Site, Coventry is an oil on canvas painting undertaken in 1942 by the British artist Laura Knight. It portrays a group of people—mostly women—working to launch a barrage balloon on the outside of Coventry, an industrial city in the Midlands that was the target of a German bombing raid in November 1940, when over 10,000 incendiary bombs were dropped on the city.

Knight had painted In for Repairs, showing members of the Women's Auxiliary Air Force (WAAF) repairing a damaged barrage balloon, in early 1942. The Air Ministry was so impressed that they asked her to paint the WAAF in action. She was commissioned by the War Artists' Advisory Committee (WAAC) and paid 100 guineas for the work, which was undertaken in July and August 1942. A Balloon Site was displayed at the 1943 Royal Academy Summer Exhibition, along with Ruby Loftus Screwing a Breech Ring (1943).

Background

From March 1939, Coventry had been protected by barrage balloons; the city was an industrial target and contained aircraft factories on the outskirts. The balloons were filled with hydrogen and were either set in fixed sites, or adapted for mobile deployment. They were fixed by steel cables which forced bombers to fly at a higher altitude than they would have preferred. In this way the bombing was less accurate, and the aeroplanes more vulnerable to ground-based anti-aircraft fire. The protection was not infallible, and, on 14 November 1940 Coventry was the target of a German bombing raid when over 10,000 incendiary bombs were dropped on the city. From April 1941 women were used to operate the balloons, a crew of fourteen women replacing the ten men that do so previously.

History
During the Second World War the British government formed the War Artists' Advisory Committee (WAAC) under the chairmanship of Sir Kenneth Clark, the director of the National Gallery. The committee was "to draw up a list of artists qualified to record the war at home and abroad". One of those commissioned on several occasions was the British painter Laura Knight, who had painted for the Canadian government during the First World War. By early 1942 she had painted four pictures for the WAAF; the most recent was In for Repairs, showing members of the Women's Auxiliary Air Force (WAAF) repairing a damaged barrage balloon. The Air Ministry was impressed with the picture and its potential to help with recruiting. She worked on the piece in July and August 1942, and was paid 100 guineas for the work.

A Balloon Site was displayed at the 1943 Royal Academy Summer Exhibition, as was Ruby Loftus Screwing a Breech Ring, a painting Knight had just completed. Both works were warmly received.

Painting
It shows the launch of a barrage ballon on the outskirts of Coventry. In the middle distance are several damaged buildings, and the partial ruins of Coventry shown in the background. In the foreground two groups work on launching the balloon. The group in the foreground—composed of three women and man—are under the leadership of Jean Brydon, a female sergeant. A second group are shown on the far side of the balloon.

According to the art historians Teresa Grimes, Judith Collins and Oriana Baddeley, A Balloon Site and In For Repairs "are about activity, the concentration and absorption in work generated by a group endeavour are central to their composition".

Notes and references

Notes

References

Sources

Books

Journals and magazines

News

Websites
 
 

1942 paintings
British women in World War II
Paintings in the collection of the Imperial War Museum
Cultural history of World War II
Paintings by Laura Knight
Portraits of women
United Kingdom home front during World War II
War paintings
Women in the United Kingdom
Cultural depictions of British women
Balloons (aeronautics)
Aviation art